Heinz Peischl (born 9 December 1963) is a retired Austrian football midfielder and later manager.

References

1963 births
Living people
Austrian footballers
SC Eisenstadt players
FC Linz players
FC Wacker Innsbruck players
FC Schaan players
1. Wiener Neustädter SC players
Association football midfielders
Austrian Football Bundesliga players
Austrian football managers
FC St. Gallen managers
FC Thun managers
Austrian expatriate footballers
Austrian expatriate football managers
Austrian expatriate sportspeople in Switzerland
Expatriate football managers in Switzerland
Austria international footballers
People from Güssing District
Footballers from Burgenland
Austrian expatriate sportspeople in Liechtenstein
Expatriate footballers in Liechtenstein
FC Tirol Innsbruck managers
FC Tirol Innsbruck players
FC Swarovski Tirol players